Helmut Kuhnert (born 1 March 1936) is a retired East German speed skater. He competed at the 1956, 1960 and 1964 Winter Olympics in eight events in total. His best achievements were ninth place in 5000 m in 1956 and in 1500 m in 1960. He won a bronze all-around medal at the 1960 World Championships.

Personal bests:
500 m – 41.8 (1964)
 1500 m – 2:12.4 (1960)
 5000 m – 8:03.0 (1956)
 10000 m – 16:33.2 (1956)

References

1936 births
Living people
German male speed skaters
Olympic speed skaters of the United Team of Germany
Speed skaters at the 1956 Winter Olympics
Speed skaters at the 1960 Winter Olympics
Speed skaters at the 1964 Winter Olympics
Speed skaters from Berlin
World Allround Speed Skating Championships medalists
20th-century German people